Kamenický Šenov is a town in Česká Lípa District in the Liberec Region of the Czech Republic. It has about 3,900 inhabitants. The historic town centre is well preserved and is protected by law as an urban monument zone.

Administrative parts
The village of Prácheň is an administrative part of Kamenický Šenov.

Geography
It lies in the Central Bohemian Uplands. The Šenovský Creek springs in the territory and flows through the town.

History

The first written mention of Kamenický Šenov is from 1352, as a village called Sonov founded by immigrant Sorbs. The village belonged to the Česká Kamenice estate, therefore it began to be called Kamenický Šenov.

In the 17th century, the local glassmakers are first mentioned, and during the 17th and 18th centuries there was a massive boom in glass refining and in glass trade. The glass industry significantly contributed to the rapid growth of Kamenický Šenov and the inhabitants began to get rich.

Until 1918, the town was part of the Habsburg monarchy (Cisleithania, the northern and western part of Austria-Hungary after the compromise of 1867), in the Tetschen – Děčín District, one of the 94 Bezirkshauptmannschaften in Bohemia.

Demographics

Economy
The town has a long history of glass works. It is also known for the manufacture of chandeliers, operated by the Preciosa company.

Education
The Secondary Glassmaking School in Kamenický Šenov was founded in 1856 and is the oldest vocational school of its kind in the world.

Sights

The history of glass making in the town is presented in Glass Museum Kamenický Šenov. It is located in a historic house, built around 1770.

The main landmark of the town centre is the Church of the Birth of Saint John the Baptist. It is a Baroque building, built in 1715–1718.

Panská skála is a national nature monument and a symbol of the town. It is a basalt rock, locally known as the "stone organ pipes".

Notable people
Ignaz Pallme (1806–1877), German explorer
Franz Bischoff (1864–1929), American artist

Twin towns – sister cities

Kamenický Šenov is twinned with:
 Rheinbach, Germany

References

External links

Steinschönau Genealogy website
Official website of Glass school Kamenický Šenov

Cities and towns in the Czech Republic
Populated places in Česká Lípa District